Rynakowice  is a village in the administrative district of Gmina Żórawina, within Wrocław County, Lower Silesian Voivodeship, in south-western Poland.

The village has a population of 39.

References

Rynakowice